Ceranemota albertae, the Alberta lutestring, is a species of moth of the family Drepanidae first described by John Frederick Gates Clarke in 1938. It is found in western Canada, from south-central British Columbia east to south-eastern Saskatchewan. The habitat consists of dry open woodlands and shrub areas with wild cherry.

The wingspan is 32–39 mm. Adults are similar to Ceranemota tearlei and Ceranemota partida, but are darker and more silvery. Adults are on wing from August to September depending on the location.

References

Thyatirinae
Moths of North America
Moths described in 1938